The non-Catholic cemetery is situated in Syracuse, in the garden of Villa Landolina, now part of the Museo archeologico regionale Paolo Orsi. It was forbidden to bury in holy land non-Catholic people – including Protestants and Jews – as well as people having committed suicide.

The Landolina family decided to realize the non-Catholic cemetery in its own garden. The cemetery is very small and contains twelve tombs built in the 19th century for some foreigners who died in Syracuse, they usually were travelers or military men.

The German poet August von Platen and some American navy men who took part in the First Barbary War (1801-1805) are buried there. The Americans are Joseph Maxwell, Seth Cartee (Carter), William Tyler, James Deblois and George S. Hackey.

The funerary monuments have been restored between 2012 and 2015.

External links 
 The cemetery on the unofficial website of the archeological museum
 

Cemeteries in Syracuse